Square sign may refer to:
The number sign #
The radical symbol  or √ used for square root, or its precomposed form with a number, such as the Unicode characters for the cube root and the fourth root, ∛ and ∜
Any square-shaped symbol, including many geometrically shaped Unicode characters